was a Japanese film actor active from the 1920s to the 1950s. He featured in over 90 films.

Career
Born in Saga Prefecture, Yokoo studied Western painting at the Tokyo Bijitsu Gakkō (now the Tokyo University of the Arts). He joined the art department of the Shochiku studio in 1923, eventually becoming an assistant director, but due his large size, started playing comedic roles in films. He appeared in most of the films of Denmei Suzuki as well as in many comedy shorts directed by Torajiro Saito. After leaving Shochiku, he joined the comedy revue of Roppa Furukawa. After WWII, he appeared in many films starring Kin'ichi Shimizu.

He played a supporting role in  Geisha Girl (1952).

References

External links
 

1899 births
1956 deaths
Place of death missing
Actors from Saga Prefecture
Japanese male film actors
Tokyo University of the Arts alumni
Japanese military personnel